Jean Michel may refer to:

 Jean Michel (fencer), French Olympic fencer
 Jean Michel (poet) (died 1501), French dramatic poet
 Jean Michel (politician) (born 1949), French politician

See also
 Jean-Michel, French masculine given name